Joseph Campbell (13 April 1894 – 1976) was an English footballer who played as a winger for Wigan Borough and Rochdale.

References

Rochdale A.F.C. players
Oldham Athletic A.F.C. players
Wigan Borough F.C. players
Great Harwood F.C. players
Stalybridge Celtic F.C. players
Morecambe F.C. players
English footballers
Footballers from Blackburn
Association football wingers
1894 births
1976 deaths